The Sciotoville Bridge is a steel continuous truss bridge carrying railway tracks belonging to CSX Transportation across the Ohio River between Siloam - a junction located north of Limeville, Kentucky and east of South Shore, Kentucky - and Sciotoville, Ohio in the United States.  Designed by Gustav Lindenthal, the bridge was constructed in 1916 by Chesapeake and Ohio Railway subsidiary Chesapeake and Ohio Northern Railway as part of a new route between Ashland, Kentucky and Columbus, Ohio.

The bridge is continuous across two  spans, and is considered an engineering marvel. It held the record for longest continuous truss span in the world from its opening until 1945.

See also
List of crossings of the Ohio River
List of longest continuous truss bridge spans

References

External links
C&O Sciotoville Bridge at Bridges & Tunnels
 Colossus on the Ohio at Minford, Ohio Schools
True story involving the Sciotoville Bridge Dipping Ice Cream

Railroad bridges in Ohio
Railroad bridges in Kentucky
Bridges over the Ohio River
Continuous truss bridges in the United States
Bridges completed in 1916
Bridges in Greenup County, Kentucky
Buildings and structures in Scioto County, Ohio
Transportation in Scioto County, Ohio
Chesapeake and Ohio Railway
CSX Transportation bridges
Portsmouth, Ohio
Steel bridges in the United States